Joseph Marie Alphonse Nicolas Jongen (14 December 1873 – 12 July 1953) was a Belgian organist, composer, and music educator.

Biography
Jongen was born in Liège, where his parents had moved from Flanders. On the strength of an amazing precocity for music, he was admitted to the Liège Conservatoire at the extraordinarily young age of seven, and spent the next sixteen years there. Jongen won a First Prize for Fugue in 1895, an honors diploma in piano the next year, and another for organ in 1896. In 1897, he won the Belgian Prix de Rome, which allowed him to travel to Italy, Germany and France.

He began composing at the age of 13, and immediately exhibited exceptional talent in that field too. By the time he published his Opus 1, he already had dozens of works to his credit. His monumental and massive First String Quartet was composed in 1894 and was submitted for the annual competition for fine arts held by the Royal Academy of Belgium, where it was awarded the top prize by the jury.

In 1902, he returned to his native land, and in the following year he was named a professor of harmony and counterpoint at his old Liège college. With the outbreak of World War I, he and his family moved to England, where he founded a piano quartet. When peace returned, he came back to Belgium and was named professor of fugue at the Royal Conservatory of Brussels. From 1925 until 1939, he served as director of that institution; he was succeeded by his brother Léon Jongen. Fourteen years after leaving the directorship, Joseph Jongen died at Sart-lez-Spa, Belgium.

Compositions
From his teens to his seventies Jongen composed a great deal, including symphonies, concertos (for cello, for piano and for harp), chamber music (notably a late string trio and three string quartets), and songs, some with piano, others with orchestra. (His list of opus numbers eventually reached 241, but he destroyed many pieces.) Today, the only part of his oeuvre performed with any regularity is his output for organ, much of it solo, some of it in combination with other instruments.

His monumental Symphonie Concertante of 1926 is a tour de force, considered by many to be among the greatest works ever written for organ and orchestra. Numerous eminent organists of modern times (such as Virgil Fox, Alexander Frey, Jean Guillou, Michael Murray, Diane Meredith Belcher and Olivier Latry) have championed and recorded it. The work was commissioned by Rodman Wanamaker for debut in the Grand Court of his palatial Philadelphia department store, Wanamaker's. Its intended use was for the re-dedication of the world's largest pipe organ there, the Wanamaker Organ, as part of a series of concerts Rodman Wanamaker funded with Leopold Stokowski and the Philadelphia Orchestra.  Wanamaker's death in 1928 precluded the performance of the work at that time in the venue for which it was written, but it was finally performed for the first time with the Wanamaker Organ and the Philadelphia Orchestra on 27 September 2008.

In 1945, Jongen composed the Mass, Op. 130, for choir, brass and organ, in memory of his brother Alphonse.

Honours 
 1919: Officer of the Order of Leopold.
 1932 : Commander of the Order of Leopold.
 1934 : Grand Officer in the Order of Leopold II.
 Member of the Royal Academy of Science, Letters and Fine Arts of Belgium

References

Some of the information on this page appears on the website of Edition Silvertrust but permission has been granted to copy, distribute and/or modify this document under the terms of the GNU Free Documentation License.

External links
Worklist
Les Amis de Joseph Jongen
Joseph Jongen String Quartet Nos.1 & 2, Opp.3 & 50 & Piano Trio No.1, Op.10 Soundbites and short biography.
 Koninklijk Conservatorium Brussel and Conservatoire royal de Bruxelles now houses most works and manuscripts of Jongen, after the bankruptcy of CeBeDeM in 2015.

 Joseph Jongen. Petit Prélude (1937). Andrew Pink (2021) Exordia ad missam.

Belgian classical composers
Belgian male classical composers
Romantic composers
20th-century classical composers
Members of the Royal Academy of Belgium
Grand Officers of the Order of Leopold II
Academic staff of the Royal Conservatory of Liège
Belgian classical organists
Male classical organists
Composers for pipe organ
Belgian music educators
Child classical musicians
Prix de Rome (Belgium) winners
Musicians from Liège
1873 births
1953 deaths
Musicians awarded knighthoods
20th-century Belgian male musicians
19th-century Belgian male musicians